Sept-Forges is a former commune in the Orne department in north-western France. On 1 January 2016, it was merged into the new commune of Juvigny Val d'Andaine.

See also 

 Communes of the Orne department
 Parc naturel régional Normandie-Maine

References 

Septforges